Oskaras Koršunovas (born 6 March 1969) is a Lithuanian theatre director.

Biography 
Oskaras Koršunovas was born on March 6, 1969, in Vilnius, Lithuania. He began his career as a theatre director in 1994 at the Lithuanian Academy of Music and Theatre, where he obtained his master's degree in directing. During his studies he established already his individual signature in the most important theaters in Lithuania by producing a trilogy of plays such as the There to be Here (1990), The Old Woman (1992) and Hello Sonya New Year (1994), which were based on the work of Daniil Kharms and Alexander Vvedensky, both Russian avant-garde writers of the twentieth century. From early stages on Oskaras stood out for his unique theatrical language and new contemporary approach to stage performances that theatre critics envisaged as the inevitable emergence of a new theatre.

Henceforth, Oskaras went on with like-minded colleagues and founded in 1998 the renowned repertory theatre the Oskaras Koršunovas Theatre (OKT) with the purpose to distance themselves from the artistic reality of that time and create a new reality which was based on a contemporary theatre language. The intention was to find new ways to communicate with the audience by implementing controversial ideas. His perception that contemporary plays should reflect present time and predict the future as a warning element caught the attention of the audience. Oskaras became the first director to examine independent, post-communist Lithuanian society, and its relationships and conflicts and he kept looking for new forms and ways of communicating by stepping beyond the borders of the traditional understanding of theatre.

For his work, Oskaras received the Lithuanian National Prize for Culture and Arts in 2002, the Europe Prize Theatrical Realities in 2006, the Meyerhold Prize in 2010 and national Golden Cross Awards in three different years 2004, 2011 and 2012. He has produced and directed over 70 plays. Among them stand Shakespeare’s Hamlet in 2008, The Lower Depths in 2010 which was awarded as The Best Performance of 2010 and Miranda, based on Shakespeare’s The Tempest in 2012 that gained international fame and received three national awards of the Golden Cross in 2012: for best directing, best leading actress (Airida Gintautaite) and the best composer (Gintaras Sodeika). The Oskaras Koršunovas Theatre toured amongst the famous Lithuanian theaters and produced projects that were staged in France, Germany, Spain, Italy, Portugal, Australia, Japan, China, Israel, South Korea, Brazil, Argentina and the United States. Also he has participated in festivals worldwide including the prestigious Edinburgh International Festival and the Festival d’Avignon.

Moreover, Oskaras was awarded the Cross of Officer of Order of the Lithuanian Grand Duke Gediminas and the honorable title of Chevalier of the French Ordre des Arts et des Lettres.

List of directed plays 

1990. “Here to be There“, Play by Aleksandr Vvedensky and Daniil Kharms at Music Academy of Lithuania / Academic Drama Theatre / Youth Theatre, Vilnius, Lithuania
1992. "The Old Woman”, Play by Daniil Kharms, Academic Drama Theatre
1993. "Jelizaveta Bam", Play Daniil Kharms, Parchem City Theatre, Germany
1994. "Hello Sonia New Year”, Play by Aleksandr Vvedensky, Academic Drama Theatre
1994. "The Old Woman 2", Play by Daniil Kharms, Academic Drama Theatre
1995. "The Flying Dutchman", Opera by Richard Wagner, National Opera and Ballet Theatre of Lithuania
1997. "P.S. Byla OK", Play by Sigitas Parulskis, Academic Drama Theatre
1998. "Roberto Zucco", Play by Bernard-Marie Koltès, Academic Drama Theatre
1998. "Jelizaveta Bam", Play by Daniil Kharms, "Studio" Theatre, Warszawa, Poland
1998. "Coco", Play by Bernard-Marie Koltès, OKT / National Opera and Ballet Theatre of Lithuania
1999. "Shopping and Fucking", Play by Mark Ravenhill, OKT
1999. "A Midsummer Night's Dream", Play by William Shakespeare, OKT
2000. "Vienos nakties susitikimas", Play by Goran Stefanofski, EU - Culture 2000, THEOREM / Institute of Sweden
2000. "Fireface", Play by Marius von Mayenburg, OKT
2000. "The Master and Margarita", based on novel by Mikhail Bulgakov, adaptation by Sigitas Parulskis, OKT
2001. ”Sanatorium under the Sign of Hourglass", based on short stories by Bruno Schultz, "Studio" theatre, Warszawa, Poland
2001. "We are not Cookies", based on writings by Daniil Kharms and Aleksandr Vvedensky, Oslo National Drama Theatre, Norway
2001. "The Parasites", Play by Marius von Mayenburg, OKT
2002. "Crave", Play by Sarah Kane, co-directed with Povilas Laurinkus, OKT
2002. "Oedipus the King", Play by Sophocles, OKT
2003. "Winter", Play by Jon Fosse, The National Theatre in Oslo, Norway
2003. "Cleansed", Play by Sarah Kane, Stockholm Royal Drama Theatre, "Elverket" Scene, Sweden
2003. "The Most Excellent and Lamentable Tragedy of Romeo and Juliet, Play by William Shakespeare, OKT
2004. "The Cold Child ", Play by Marius von Mayenburg, Klaipėda Drama Theatre, Lithuania
2004. "Cantio", Play by Sharon Lynn Joyce and Vykintas Baltakas, OKT / Festival Gaida / München Bienále
2004. "Loneliness for Two", Play by Sigitas Parulskis, festival Gaida
2005. "City" (Город), Play by Yevgeni Grishkovets, co-directed with Saulius Mykolaitis, OKT
2005. "Death of Tarelkin" (Смерть Тарелкина). Play by A.Suchov-Kobylin, Moscow Theatre "Et-cetera", Russia
2005. "Based on a truth Story", Play by Almir Imsirevic, Moscow Theatre "Et-cetera", Russia
2005. "Playing the Victim" (Изображая жертву) Play by Vladimir Presniakov and Oleg Presniakov, OKT / Vilnius City Theatre
2006. "To Damascus", Play by August Strindberg, The National Theatre in Oslo, Norway
2006. "Make-up opera", Play by Birutė Mar, Antanas Kučinskas. OKT / Vilnius City Theatre
2006. "Winter", Play by Jon Fosse, OKT / Vilnius City Theatre
2006. "The Magic Flute", by Wolfgang Amadeus Mozart. Teatro Regio di Torino. Italy
2007. "The Taming of the Shrew", by William Shakespeare. Comédie-Française. Paris
2008. "These Eyes", by Jon Fosse. European Capital of Culture project Fairytales in Landscape, Lundsneset Peninsula, Stavanger, Norway
2008. "Hamlet", by William Shakespeare. OKT / Vilnius City Theatre
2010. "The Taming of the Shrew", by William Shakespeare. Alexandrinsky Theatre, St. Petersburg, Russia
2010. "The Lower Depths" ("На дне") by Maksim Gorky. OKT / Vilnius City Theatre
2010. "The Tempest" by William Shakespeare. Reykjavik City Theatre, Iceland
2011. "Tartuffe" by Molière. Aarhus Theatre, Denmark
2011. "Miranda" based on the play The Tempest by William Shakespeare. OKT / Vilnius City Theatre
2011. "Banishment", by Marius Ivaškevičius, Lithuanian National Drama Theatre, Vilnius, Lithuania
2012. "Peer Gynt" after Henrik Ibsen, The National Theatre in Oslo, Norway
2012. "Cathedral" after Justinas Marcinkevičius, Lithuanian National Drama Theatre, Vilnius, Lithuania
2013. "Krapp's last tape", play Samuel Beckett. OKT / Vilnius City Theatre
2013. "Fidelio", Ludwig van Beethoven’s opera, Bergen National Opera, Bergen, Norway
2013. "Lost Time" Musical Spectacle after Marcel Proust, festival “Gaida”, Vilnius, Lithuania
2014. "The Seagull” Play by Anton Chekhov - OKT / Vilnius City Theatre
2014. "Expulsion" after Marius Ivaškevičius, Dailes Theatre, Riga, Latvia
2014. "Vinter" after Jon Fosse, Teatro del Giglio, Lucca, Italy
2015. "Fidelio", Ludwig van Beethoven’s opera, Lithuanian National Opera and Ballet Theatre, Vilnius, Lithuania
2015. "Elisabeth Bam" after Daniil Kharms, OKT/Vilnius City Theatre, Lithuanian National Drama Theatre, Vilnius, Lithuania
2015. "Martyr" after Marius von Mayenburg, Lithuanian National Drama Theatre, Vilnius, Lithuania
2015. "Our Class" after Tadeusz Słobodzianek, The National Theatre in Oslo, Norway
2015. "Miranda" after William Shakespeare, “Poreia” Theatre, Athens, Greece
2016. "Egle the Queen of Serpents" - Lithuanian National Drama Theatre
2016. "Marriage" - Bertolt Brecht - OKT, Vilnius
2016. "Measure for Measure" after William Shakespeare, „Teatr Dramatyczny“, Warsaw, Poland
2016. "Cleansed" after Sarah Kane, OKT/Vilnius City Theatre, Lithuanian Academy of Music and Theatre, Vilnius, Lithuania
2017. "Dance Delhi" after Ivan Vyrypaev, OKT, Vilnius
2018. "Madman" after Nikolai Gogol, OKT, Vilnius

Awards 

1990. “Fringe Firsts” at the Edinburgh International Theatre Festival for "There to Be Here.” Edinburgh.
1991. Special prize of the Torun International Theatre Festival “Kontakt” for "There to Be Here.” Torun
1991. "Fringe First "at the Edinburg International Theatre Festival for the play "There to Be Here.“ Edinburgh
1993. Prize for the Best Director’s work at the St. Petersburg international Theatre Festival for "There to Be Here“ and "The Old Woman.“ St. Petersburg
1993. Prize of the Sevastopol International Theatre Festival “The Kherson Games” for “There to Be Here.” Sebastopol
1993. Prize of the magazine “St. Petersburg Theatre Review” for "There to Be Here.” St Petersburg
1994. Prize of the Lithuanian Theatre Union for "Hello Sonya New Year.” 
1995. "The Bank of Scotland Herald Angels" Prize at the Edinburgh International Theatre Festival for "Hello Sonya New Year.” Edinburgh.
1995. Lithuanian Theatre Award “Kristoforas” for the Best young artist for the trilogy: "There to Be Here", "The Old Woman", "Hello Sonya New Year.”
1997. Special Prize of the "Soros Fund "at the Riga Theatre Festival “Homo Novus” for "P.S. File O.K"
1998. Prize of the Torun International Theatre Festival “Kontakt” for the Best  Director for "Old Woman 2.” Torun
2000. Lithuanian Theatre Award ”Kristoforas” for the Best Director for "A Midsummer Night’s Dream.”
2000. Lithuanian Theatre Award ”Kristoforas” for the Best Director for "Shopping and Fucking.”
2000. 2nd Award of the Torun International Theatre Festival “Kontakt” for the Best Performance "A Midsummer Night’s Dream.”
2001. European Theatre unions Award "Europe Theatre Prize for New Theatrical Realities.”
2001. Best young Director Prize at the MESS Festival, for “The Master and Margarita.” Sarajevo
2002. Montblanc  Theatre Prize "Young Directors Project Award" at Salzburg International Theatre festival for "Oedipus Rex.” Salzburg
2002. The Lithuanian National Prize of Culture and Art for "Oedipus Rex.”
2003. Cross of Officer of the Order of the Lithuanian Grand Duke Gediminas.
2003. Critic’s Prize at the MESS Festival for “Oedipus Rex”. Sarajevo.
2003. Award of Golden Cross of the Stage for The Most Excellent and Lamentable Tragedy of “Romeo and Juliet.”
2003. Award of Golden Cross of the Stage for “The Cold Child.”
2004. The Lithuanian Institute Award “LT Identity” for the weightiest contribution in representing the Lithuanian Culture.
2004. Lithuanian Theatre Award ”Golden Stage Cross” for the performances: "Romeo and Juliet” and "Cold Child.”
2004. "Mira Trailovi" Grand Prix at Belgrade International Theatre Festival for "Romeo and Juliet" Belgrad.
2006. Europe Theatre Prize - Europe Prize Theatrical Realities 
2006. Golden Cross of Merit from the President of Poland. Warsaw
2009. Honourable title of the Chevalier of the French order of Literature and Arts Paris.
2010. First Prize of the Annual Meyerhold Assembly, Moscow
2010. Award of Golden Cross of the Best director of Stage for “The Lower Depths.” Performance of the year.
2011. Award of Golden Cross of the Stage for “Expulsion.”
2011. Award of Golden Cross of the Stage for “Miranda.”
2012. The Medal of the Lithuanian Ministry of Culture “Bring Your Light and Believe.”  
2012. Prize of Best Director in International Festival “Kontakt”, Poland.
2013. Hedda Award for Best Director of the Year for “Peer Gynt.” Oslo, Norway
2013. Best Director and Best Performance Award at the Croatian International Small Stage Festival for “Miranda."
2014. Three awards for “The Seagull” including, Best Director, Special Critics and Press Award and Third Prize for the Performance at the "International Theatre Festival KONTAKT.”
2014. Two awards at International Theatre Festival “Baltic House” including Critics Prize for "The Seagull" and the Audience Prize for “Krapp's Last Tape.”
2015. Prestigious award: Swedish Commander Grand Cross: Order of the Polar Star.

References

External links
  Official Oskaras Koršunovas Theatre (OKT) site
  Theatre: Between Modernism and Postmodernism (article on modern Lithuanian theatre)
  Interview with Korsunovas by the Italian critic Gherardo Vitali Rosati
  Tartuffe
  Regard Sur L'Est
  La Terrasse
  Je Me Livre
  Ouest France - Hamlet vu par Oskaras Korsunovas Herouville
  Pays Baltes.com - Solitude a deux le theatre.html
  Lituanie Culture - Oskaras Korsunovas Honore par la France
  Les Trois Coups - Article
  AgoraVox - Culture Loisirs
  Cote Caen - Les Boreales Decouvrez Le Theatre d'Oskaras Korsunovas
  Rue du Theatre
  Tandem Arrasdouai - Documents and Dossier Hamlet
  Ouest France - Normandie/La Mouette de Lituanie fait son nid la Comedie

Lithuanian theatre directors
Recipients of the Lithuanian National Prize
Living people
1969 births
People from Vilnius
Lithuanian Academy of Music and Theatre alumni